Protostane is a tetracyclic triterpene, its natural distribution is primarily limited to the genus Alisma. It is named of considered to be the "prototype" of steroids.

See also
 Fusidane
 Dammarane
 Lanostane

References

Triterpenes